Maheshpur Upazila is a part of Jhenaidah District in the Khulna Division of Bangladesh.

Geography
Maheshpur Upazila, has an area of 419.53 km2.

Maheshpur Upazila has 12 unions, namely: SBK, Fotepur, Pantapara, Shoruppur, Shamkur, Nepa, Kajirber, Bashbaria, Jadoppur, Natima, Mandarbaria and Ajompur. Maheshpur (Town) consists of 9 wards and 14 mahallas. Maheshpur thana was turned into an upazila in 1983.

Maheshpur Upazila shares borders with Bagdah CD Block in North 24 Parganas district in West Bengal, India to the west, Kotchandpur Upazila and Chaugachha Upazila of Jessore to the east, Chaugacha Upazila of Jessore to the south and Jibannagar Upazila of Chuuadanga district to the north side.

The main river flowing through this upazila is Kapotakkho Nod.

It has 41,995 household units and total area 419.53 km2.

Demographics
According to the 2011 Bangladesh census, Maheshpur had a population of 332,514. Males constituted 50.01% of the population and females 49.99%. Muslims formed 96.11% of the population, Hindus 3.84%, Christians 0.02% and others 0.03%. Maheshpur had a literacy rate of 44.79% for the population 7 years and above.

The area of the town is 11.47 km2. The town has a population of 26,473; male 51.26% and female 48.74%;

Administration
Maheshpur Upazila is divided into Maheshpur Municipality and 12 union parishads: Azampur, Banshbaria, Fatepur, Jadabpur, Kazirber, Manderbaria, Natima, Nepa, Panthapara, S.B.K., Shyamkur, and Swaruppur. The union parishads are subdivided into 150 mauzas and 196 villages.

Maheshpur Municipality is subdivided into 9 wards and 16 mahallas.

Upazila Nirbahi Officer (UNO)

Members of Parliament (MP)

Upazila Porishad

Union Porishad

Education
Maheshpur also has the following educational institutions:

 Mohespur Govt. Degree College: Maheshpur Gov. Degree College is one of the oldest colleges in Maheshpur. Maheshpur Gov. Degree College was founded in 1985. It is the oldest and one of the most famous educational institutions in Maheshpur Upazila.
Bir Sherstha Shahid Hamidur Rahman Govt. College, Khalish pur Bazar. This college was founded in 2000. It has one of the best reputations among Moheshpur Upazila colleges.
 Shohidul Islam degree college, Voiroba, Maheshpur, Jhenaidah.
 Moheshpur Gov. Pilot Model High School, Maheshpur, Jhenaidah. It is the oldest high school in this police station area. It was established in 1863. The students of Moheshpur Gov. Pilot Model High School feel pride to recollect their past.
 Samonta High School, Maheshpur, Jhenaidah.
 Samonta Dhakhil Madrasa, Maheshpur, Jhenaidah. It is the oldest Madrasa in Maheshpur.
 Voiroba Senior Madrasa, Voiroba, Maheshpur, Jhenaidah.

Notable residents
 Hamidur Rahman, a sepoy awarded the Bir Sreshtho (the highest military award of Bangladesh), was born at Khorda Khalishpur village in 1953. The village was renamed Hamid Nagar in his honour.

See also
Upazilas of Bangladesh
Districts of Bangladesh
Divisions of Bangladesh

References

External links
 www.dcjhenaidah.gov.bd
 www.dcjessore.gov.bd

Upazilas of Jhenaidah District
Jhenaidah District
Khulna Division